Noton Osborne (1844 – 10 December 1878) was an Australian cricketer. He played one first-class cricket match for Victoria in 1871.

See also
 List of Victoria first-class cricketers

References

1844 births
1878 deaths
Australian cricketers
Victoria cricketers
Place of birth missing